Pseudo-Cushing's syndrome or non-neoplastic hypercortisolism is a medical condition in which patients display the signs, symptoms, and abnormal cortisol levels seen in Cushing's syndrome. However, pseudo-Cushing's syndrome is not caused by a problem with the hypothalamic-pituitary-adrenal axis as Cushing's is; it is mainly an idiopathic condition, however a cushingoid appearance is sometimes linked to excessive alcohol consumption. Elevated levels of total cortisol can also be due to estrogen found in oral contraceptive pills that contain a mixture of estrogen and progesterone. Estrogen can cause an increase of cortisol-binding globulin and thereby cause the total cortisol level to be elevated.

Signs and symptoms

Diagnosis
 Levels of cortisol and ACTH both elevated
 24-hour urinary cortisol levels elevated
 Dexamethasone suppression test
 Late night salivary cortisol (LNSC)
 Loss of diurnal variation in cortisol levels (seen only in true Cushing's Syndrome)
 High mean corpuscular volume and gamma-glutamyl transferase may be clues to alcoholism
 Polycystic Ovarian Syndrome should be ruled out; PCOS may have similar symptoms

Differential diagnosis
 Differentiation from Cushing's is difficult, but several tools exist to aid in the diagnosis
 Alternative causes of Cushing's should be excluded with imaging of lungs, adrenal glands, and pituitary gland; these often appear normal in Cushing's
 In the alcoholic patient with pseudo-Cushing's, admission to hospital (and avoidance of alcohol) will result in normal midnight cortisol levels within five days, excluding Cushing's
 Another cause for Cushing's syndrome is adrenocortical carcinoma. This is a rare form of cancer with an incidence of 1-2 per million people annually. About 60% of these cancers produce hormones, with cortisol being the most frequent. Most patients present in an advanced disease state and the outcome is dismal.

Prognosis
 Blood results and symptoms normalise rapidly on cessation of drinking or remission of depression.

References

External links 

Syndromes
Endocrine diseases